Qian Ying may mean:
Qian Ying (Kuomintang politician), member of the Legislative Yuan of the Republic of China 1948–
Qian Ying (communist politician), Minister of Supervision of the People's Republic of China 1954–1959